Tianweitania is a genus of bacteria from the family of Phyllobacteriaceae, with one known species (Tianweitania sediminis).

References

Phyllobacteriaceae
Bacteria genera
Monotypic bacteria genera